This is a comprehensive list of all Article III and Article IV United States federal judges appointed by President Joe Biden as well as a partial list of Article I federal judicial appointments, excluding appointments to the District of Columbia judiciary.

, the United States Senate has confirmed 117 Article III judges nominated by Biden: one Associate Justice of the Supreme Court of the United States, 31 judges for the United States courts of appeals and 85 judges for the United States district courts. There are 34 nominations awaiting Senate action: 6 for the courts of appeals, and 28 for the district courts. There are 8 vacancies on the U.S. courts of appeals, 63 vacancies on the U.S. district courts, two vacancies on the United States Court of International Trade, as well as 25 announced federal judicial vacancies that will occur before the end of Biden's term (3 for the courts of appeals and 22 for district courts). Biden has not made any recess appointments to the federal courts. Biden had the largest number of Article III judicial nominees confirmed during a president's first year in office since Ronald Reagan in 1981.

Regarding the Article I courts, the Senate has confirmed three judges nominated by Biden, two to the United States Court of Federal Claims and one to the United States Court of Appeals for the Armed Forces. There is one nomination to the Article I courts awaiting Senate action. There are two vacancies on the United States Court of Federal Claims and three on the United States Tax Court. On March 2, 2021, Biden designated Elaine D. Kaplan as Chief Judge of the Court of Federal Claims. Biden has not elevated any judges to the position of Chief Judge.

Regarding Article IV territorial courts, there are three vacancies and no pending nominations. The Senate has not confirmed any Article IV judges nominated by Biden.

Supreme Court of the United States

United States courts of appeals 
 Denotes nomination pending before the Senate Judiciary Committee
 Denotes nomination awaiting final confirmation by the full Senate

United States district courts 
 Denotes nomination pending before the Senate Judiciary Committee
 Denotes nomination awaiting final confirmation by the full Senate

Specialty courts (Article I)

United States Court of Federal Claims

United States Court of Appeals for the Armed Forces

See also 
 Joe Biden judicial appointment controversies
 Federal Judicial Center
 Judicial appointment history for United States federal courts
 List of presidents of the United States by judicial appointments
 List of United States district and territorial courts
 List of United States attorneys appointed by Joe Biden

Notes 

Courts

Renominations

Article III
Supreme Court

Votes

Courts of appeals

District courts

Article I
Court of Federal Claims

Court of Appeals for the Armed Forces

References 

Biden
Judicial appointments
Judges